Karel Heijting (born 1 May 1883 in Koetoardjo [], Central Java, Dutch East Indies – died August 1951 in Paris, France) was a Dutch football (soccer) player who competed in the 1908 Summer Olympics. He was a member of the Dutch team, which won the bronze medal in the football tournament.

Notes

External links
profile

1883 births
1951 deaths
Dutch footballers
Footballers at the 1908 Summer Olympics
Olympic footballers of the Netherlands
Olympic bronze medalists for the Netherlands
Netherlands international footballers
Olympic medalists in football
People from Purworejo Regency
Medalists at the 1908 Summer Olympics
Association football midfielders
Dutch people of the Dutch East Indies